Elron may refer to:

 Baruch Elron (1934–2006), Israeli painter
 Elron (rail transit), an Estonian passenger railway company
 Elron Electronic Industries, an Israeli technology company

See also
 L. Ron (disambiguation)